Auticon (stylized "auticon") is an international information technology consulting firm that exclusively employs adults on the autism spectrum as Information technology (IT) consultants. Auticon identifies as a social enterprise. 
Services mainly focus on IT quality management, including transformation, migration, data analytics, data analysis, security and deep web analysis, as well as compliance and reporting.

Auticon is based in Berlin and currently employs more than 200 members of staff, around 150 of whom are on the autism spectrum. Auticon has offices in the United Kingdom, United States, Germany, France, Switzerland, Canada, Australia, and Italy.

History 

Dirk Müller-Remus, who has a son on the autism spectrum, launched Auticon in 2011 with an investment of the Munich-based Ananda Social Venture Fund. The launch was inspired by the Belgian company Passwerk. Auticon's concept to employ people on the autism spectrum as ICT consultants has since been acknowledged internationally. The Auticon model was presented at the G8 Social Impact Investment Forum, held in London on 6 June 2013, in front of 150 leaders in social impact investment.

In 2018, Auticon acquired MindSpark, a company in Santa Monica, California, founded in 2013 by Gray Benoist, whose two sons are also on the autism spectrum.

Awards
 2013: IQ Award
 2014: BITKOM Innovator's Pitch
 2015: Deutsche Bank, Land der Ideen
 2015: New Work Award
 2015: Sonderpreis, Deutscher Gründerpreis
 2017: Social Enterprise UK Awards, One to Watch Award
 2019: Milestone Autism Resources "Visionary Employer Award" 
 2020: Fast Company World Changing Ideas

See also
Specialisterne

References 

Autism-related organizations
Software testing
Social enterprises
Companies based in Berlin
ICT service providers
German companies established in 2011